In 1999, an estimated 5,000 deaths, 325,000 hospitalizations and 76 million illnesses were caused by foodborne illnesses within the US.  The Centers for Disease Control and Prevention began tracking outbreaks starting in the 1970s. By 2012, the figures were roughly 130,000 hospitalizations and 3,000 deaths.

1850s
 The Swill milk scandal leads to the deaths of 8,000 babies in one year alone.

1919 
 35 people died in 1919 from botulism from improperly canned black olives produced in California.

1963 
 Two women died in 1963 from botulism from canned tuna fish from the Washington Packing Corporation.

1970s

1971 
 On July 2, the U.S. Food and Drug Administration (FDA) released a public warning after learning that a Westchester County, New York, man had died and his wife had become seriously ill from botulism after eating a portion of a can of Bon Vivant vichyssoise soup. 6,444 vichyssoise soup cans were recalled, including all Bon Vivant soups – more than a million cans in all. On July 7, the FDA ordered the shutdown of the company's Newark, New Jersey, plant. Out of 324 soup cans, five were found to be contaminated with botulinum toxin, all in the initial batch of vichyssoise that was recalled. The company filed for bankruptcy within a month of the start of the recall, and changed its business name to Moore & Co. The FDA resolved to destroy the company's stock of canned soup, but the company fought the proposed action in court until 1974.

1974 
 Salmonella in unpasteurized apple cider caused 200 illnesses in New Jersey.

1977 
 Botulism in peppers served at the Trini and Carmen restaurant in Pontiac, Michigan, caused the largest outbreak of botulism poisonings in the United States up to that time. The peppers were canned at home by a former employee. Fifty-nine people were sickened.

1978 
 Botulism in Clovis, New Mexico.  34 people who ate at a restaurant, Colonial Park Country Club, developed clinical botulism in the second-largest outbreak in United States history.  The outbreak was traced to either potato salad or a commercially prepared three-bean salad served to a group attending a banquet.  Despite a thorough search of the local landfill, the discarded three-bean salad containers were never located, making it impossible to test them to confirm the source of contamination.  All patients were hospitalized and 33 received trivalent botulinal antitoxin.  There were two deaths.

1980s

1983 
 Botulism (Type A Clostridium botulinum) in Peoria, Illinois. 28 persons were hospitalized, and 20 patients were treated with an antitoxin. 12 patients required ventilatory support and 1 death resulted.  The source was sautéed onions made from fresh raw onions served on a patty melt sandwich. The sandwiches were served at the Skewer Inn Restaurant located inside Northwoods Mall.

1984/85 
 Hamburger Thyrotoxicosis (alimentary thyrotoxicosis) outbreak among residents of southwestern Minnesota and adjacent areas of South Dakota and Iowa.

1985 
 A listeria outbreak in California stemmed from Mexican style soft cheese made by Jalisco. There were 52 confirmed deaths, including 19 stillbirths and 10 infant deaths. At the time, it was the deadliest foodborne illness outbreak in the United States, measured by the number of deaths, since the Centers for Disease Control and Prevention had begun tracking outbreaks in the 1970s. Alta Dena supplied the raw milk to Jalisco to make the cheese. Jalisco had a non-licensed technician perform the pasteurization, though pasteurized milk might have been diluted with non-pasteurized milk by the technician. On July 15, 1989, Alta Dena was absolved of any blame.
 As there was Salmonella typhimurium in milk from the Hillfarm Dairy in Melrose Park, Illinois, a salmonellosis outbreak occurred. At least 16,284 people were infected, all but 1,059 of them from Illinois. The others were in Indiana, Iowa, Michigan, Minnesota and Wisconsin. Two people died and the infection was a contributing factor in the deaths of "four, possibly five, others". It was the worst outbreak of salmonellosis food poisoning in United States history at the time.

1990s

1992 
 Botulism in whitefish in New Jersey. Four members of a Fort Lee family were stricken with botulism after eating fish bought in Jersey City.

1993 
 E. coli O157:H7 outbreak caused by undercooked hamburgers from Jack in the Box. Four children died and nearly 700 others became sick in the Seattle area and other parts of the Pacific Northwest. The outrage resulting from the deaths placed strong political pressure on Washington and resulted in new regulations from the USDA to reform century-old practices in the meat industry. The new regulations, titled Pathogen Reduction and Hazard Analysis and Critical Control Point Systems Final Rule, required a mandatory HACCP inspection system and microbial testing in meat processing plants.

1994 
 Botulism in El Paso, Texas. A Greek restaurant made dips from improperly stored foil-wrapped baked potatoes. Thirty persons affected; 4 required mechanical ventilation.
 Salmonella in ice cream from Schwan's Sales Enterprises of Marshall, Minnesota. Based upon the volume of ice cream produced, the number of consumers, and the attack rate amongst consumers, it is estimated that 29,100 people within Minnesota suffered from S. enteritidis gastroenteritis after eating Schwan's ice cream; and that since most of the ice cream produced during the outbreak was distributed outside Minnesota, as many as 224,000 people across the United States became sick. The contamination occurred when raw, unpasteurized eggs were hauled in a tanker truck that later carried pasteurized ice cream to the Schwan's plant. The ice cream premix was not re-pasteurized after delivery to the plant.

1996 
 E. coli O157:H7 in unpasteurized apple juice from Odwalla. The company was using blemished fruit and ignored warnings from in-house safety experts and specialized in selling unpasteurized juices for their supposed health benefits. 70 people in several U.S. states were stricken, mostly in the West, and in Canada. The outbreak caused one death, a 16-month-old girl from Colorado.
 E. coli O157:H7 in lettuce sickened at least 61 people in Illinois, Connecticut and New York in May and June 1996.
 Salmonella sickened 38 people and killed a 67-year-old woman, all of whom ate at a Wendy's restaurant in Natick, Massachusetts.  The infection was traced to an employee at the store.

1997 
 Hepatitis A on frozen strawberries from Andrew & Williamson Sales Co. of San Diego, California. The strawberries were grown in Baja California, Mexico and processed by A&W. Thousands of students from Arizona, California, Georgia, Iowa, Michigan, and Tennessee may have been exposed to the virus from eating strawberries in school lunches. Over 2.6 million pounds of strawberries were recalled.
 1997 E. coli O157:H7 in ground beef from Hudson Foods Company of Rogers, Arkansas. Burger King was the largest client. The plant was in Columbus, Nebraska. The company recalled over 25 million pounds of ground beef it had manufactured, in the second largest recall in history.

1998 
 A listeriosis outbreak, which was the third deadliest outbreak of foodborne illness in the United States since the Centers for Disease Control and Prevention started tracking in the 1970s, resulted in 14 deaths and 4 miscarriages or stillbirths. The listeria outbreak was in hot dogs and cold cuts from Sara Lee Corporation. Some sources put the death toll as high as 21.

1999 
 A Sun Orchard salmonellosis outbreak occurred when more than 400 people became infected with Salmonella Muenchen as a result of drinking contaminated unpasteurized orange juice. The juice was produced by Sun Orchard, based in Tempe, Arizona, and sold to restaurants, hotels, retail and catering outlets in 15 US states and 2 Canadian provinces under a variety of different brand names, including Sun Orchard, Earls, Joey Tomato's, Trader Joe's, Markon, Aloha, Sysco, and Voila! The outbreak resulted in 1 fatality, and is the largest outbreak of salmonellosis associated with unpasteurized juice.
 E. coli O157:H7 was found in the drinking water at the Washington County Fair in Easton, New York. Over 700 people were affected and 2 people died.

2000s

2000 
 Salmonella in bean sprouts from Pacific Coast Sprout Farms. They bought dry seeds in China and Australia and when germinated, the sprouts caused an outbreak from Oregon to Massachusetts. At least 67 people became ill, and 17 were hospitalized.
 A young girl died and 65 other people were sickened in an E. coli O157:H7 outbreak in Milwaukee, Wisconsin. The source of the outbreak was two Sizzler restaurants that apparently allowed raw meat to come into contact with other food items. The infected meat was traced to the Excel meat packing plant in Colorado.
 There were 19 confirmed cases, 19 likely cases, and 49 suspected cases of E. coli O157:H7 in Oregon in August. The cases were linked to a Wendy's restaurant, and although beef was the suspected vector of transmission, such a link was not conclusively shown.

2002 
 E. coli O157:H7 in ground beef from ConAgra. 19 people became ill in California, Colorado, Michigan, South Dakota, Washington and Wyoming as a result of eating tainted hamburger from a ConAgra plant in Greeley, Colorado. The company recalled over 19 million pounds of ground beef it had manufactured, in the third largest recall in history.
 Listeria in processed turkey from Pilgrim's Pride. The company recalled over 27 million pounds of poultry products it had manufactured, in the largest recall in history. The outbreak killed 7 people, sickened 46, and caused 3 miscarriages.
 Botulism sickened 8 people in Western Alaska as a result of eating a beached beluga whale.
 Fifty-seven people in 7 states became ill in August and September after consuming meat contaminated with E. coli O157:H7. The tainted meat originated at the meat packing plant Emmpak Foods. Emmpak recalled 2.8 million pounds of ground beef in the aftermath of the outbreak.

2003 
 A hepatitis A outbreak was one of the most widespread hepatitis A outbreak in the United States, afflicting at least 640 people, killing four people in north-eastern Ohio and south-western Pennsylvania in late 2003. The outbreak was blamed on tainted green onions at a Chi-Chi's restaurant in Monaca, Pennsylvania.

2006 
 E. coli O157:H7 from Taco Bell in South Plainfield, New Jersey and Long Island. 39 people in central New Jersey and on Long Island were sickened and suffered from hemolytic uremic syndrome. Centers for Disease Control and Prevention at first believed the E. coli O157:H7 to be in the green onions.  The FDA on December 13, 2006, said it could not confirm that scallions were the cause of the problem, as previously suspected, and that it was not ruling out any food as a possible culprit. It was later suspected that infected lettuce was the cause.
 2006 North American E. coli outbreak. E. coli O157:H7 in bagged organic spinach packaged by Natural Selection Foods and most likely supplied by Earthbound Farm in San Juan Bautista. 3 dead, and 198 people reported sickened by the outbreak across 25 U.S. states, and 1 person reported sickened by the outbreak in Ontario.

2007 
 On December 27, the Massachusetts Department of Public Health warned not to drink milk or milk-related products from Whittier Farms in Shrewsbury, MA due to a listeria bacteria contamination that resulted in two deaths.
 On October 11, food manufacturer ConAgra asked stores to pull its Banquet and generic brand chicken and turkey pot pies due to 152 cases of salmonella poisoning in 31 states being linked to the consumption of ConAgra pot pies, with 20 people hospitalized. By October 12, a full recall was announced, affecting all varieties of frozen pot pies sold under the brands Banquet, Albertson's, Food Lion, Great Value, Hill Country Fare, Kirkwood, Kroger, Meijer, and Western Family. The recalled pot pies included all varieties in  single-serving packages bearing the number P-9 or "Est. 1059" printed on the side of the package.
 E. coli O157:H7 in ground beef from the Topps Meat Company in Elizabeth, New Jersey.  it is the second-largest beef recall in United States history.
 Salmonella in Metz Fresh, California spinach. Recalled 8,000 cartons of fresh spinach. No reports of any illness.
 Botulism from cans of Castleberry's, Austex and Kroger brands of chili sauce.  In total, over 25 different brands of a variety of products were recalled by Castleberry's Food Company. The best by dates for the affected products range from April 30, 2009, through May 22, 2009. The contamination by the toxin is extremely rare for commercially canned products. CDC medical epidemiologist Dr. Michael Lynch said the last such U.S. case dates to the 1970s. The roughly 25 cases reported each year were mainly from home canned foods.
 Salmonella from Peter Pan and Great Value Peanut Butter (both manufactured by ConAgra) in 44 states. By March 7, 2007, the outbreak had grown to 425 cases in 44 states since its start in August 2006. The CDC said it is believed to be the first salmonella outbreak associated with peanut butter in United States history.
 In April and May, 14 people in 11 states were sickened after eating E. coli O157:H7-tainted beef packed by United Food Group. The meat packing company ultimately recalled 5.7 million pounds of potentially contaminated meat.

2008 
 2008 United States salmonellosis outbreak.  from April 10, 2008, the rare Saintpaul serotype of Salmonella enterica caused at least 1442 cases of salmonellosis food poisoning in 43 states throughout the United States and Canada. As of July 2008, the U.S. Food and Drug Administration suspects that the contaminated food product is a common ingredient in fresh salsa, such as raw tomato, fresh jalapeño pepper, fresh serrano pepper, and fresh cilantro. It is the largest reported salmonellosis outbreak in the United States since 1985. During a House subcommittee hearing into food supply safety and the recent salmonella contamination, a top federal official told panel members that agencies have found the source of the contamination after it showed up in yet another batch of Mexican-grown peppers. Adam Acheson, Food and Drug Administration associate commissioner for foods, said the FDA tracked the salmonella positive test to serrano peppers and irrigation water at a packing facility in Nuevo León, Mexico, and a grower in Tamaulipas. New Mexico and Texas were proportionally the hardest hit by far, with 49.7 and 16.1 reported cases per million, respectively. The greatest number of reported cases have occurred in Texas (384 reported cases), New Mexico (98), Illinois (100), and Arizona (49). There have been at least 203 reported hospitalizations linked to the outbreak, it has caused at least one death, and it may have been a contributing factor in at least one additional death. The Centers for Disease Control and Prevention (CDC) maintains that "it is likely many more illnesses have occurred than those reported." If applying a previous CDC estimated ratio of non-reported salmonellosis cases to reported cases (38.6:1), one would arrive at an estimated 40,273 illnesses from this outbreak.

2009 
 An aggressive strain of Salmonella, the Newport serotype, was found in beef products made by a Fresno, California-based unit of Cargill (Beef Packers Inc.) in August 2009, resulting in a large recall.
 Salmonellosis in peanut butter from Peanut Corporation of America in Blakely, Georgia has become "one of the nation’s worst known outbreaks of food-borne disease" in recent years. Nine are believed to have died and an estimated 22,500 were sickened.  Criminal negligence was alleged after product tested positive then re-tested "negative" by a second testing agency, and shipped on several occasions.  The product was in turn used by dozens of other manufacturers in hundreds of other products which have had to be recalled. The CEO of Peanut Corporation of America was sentenced to 28 years in prison for his role in the outbreak.
 E. coli O157:H7 was believed to have contaminated Nestlé Toll House refrigerated cookie dough. Nestlé recalled its products after the FDA reported there was a possibility that the E. coli O157:H7 outbreak, which sickened at least 66 people in 28 states, might be a result of raw cookie dough consumption.  According to Marler Clark, the number of illnesses reached 70 in 30 states by June 23, 2009, with 35 hospitalizations required, and seven cases of hemolytic-uremic syndrome. The products which were originally believed to have been tainted came from a Danville, Virginia, plant. However, no E. coli O157:H7 has been found in the plant, according to the FDA. Many media sources have failed to report that E. coli contamination has not been confirmed in Nestlé products. The CDC has reported that ground beef is not a likely source of contamination.

2010s

2010 
 More than 500 million eggs were recalled after dangerous levels of Salmonella were detected in the eggs of two Iowa producers, Wright County Egg and Hillandale Farm, that distribute eggs in 14 U.S. states. Nearly 2,000 illnesses were reported between May and July, approximately 1,300 more than usual for this strain of the bacteria. Jack DeCoster and Peter DeCoster plead guilty to the "distribution of adulterated eggs in interstate commerce," and Quality Egg "admitted to falsifying expiration dates on egg cartons" as well as to two attempts to bribe a USDA inspector In August 2010, the company recalled 380 million eggs in connection with a salmonella outbreak, and a related company, Hillandale Farms, recalled 170 million eggs.

2011 
 In 2011, the United States saw an outbreak of listeriosis from cantaloupes from Colorado that lasted from July to September. 30 people died, making it the second-deadliest recorded U.S. outbreak since the CDC began tracking outbreaks in the 1970s.
 In June 2011, twenty people fell ill from eating cantaloupe from Del Monte Fresh Produce  infected with Salmonella Panama from Guatemala. The Centers for Disease Control and Prevention had found that eight of the people sickened had eaten cantaloupes purchased from  Costco, and they used the purchase records to figure out that the food in common was cantaloupes, and they had come from the same Guatemalan farm.  Del Monte went to court to lift the import ban by the Food and Drug Administration. An investigation found that a pipe carrying raw sewage emptied into an open ditch about 110 yards from the farm's packing house.
 Andrew Williamson Fresh Produce voluntarily recalled one lot of organic grape tomatoes sold under the Limited Edition and Fresh & Easy labels due to a possible health risk from Salmonella.
 Emporia, Kansas-based Tyson Fresh Meats (Tyson Foods) announced it was recalling 131,300 pounds of ground beef products due to possible E. coli O157:H7 contamination.
 Publix Super Markets issued a voluntary recall for spinach dip because it may have been adulterated with Listeria monocytogenes.
 Roundy's Super Markets Inc., a Milwaukee, Wisconsin-based company with an establishment in Kenosha, Wisconsin, recalled 360 pounds of breaded chicken breast products, that should have been fully cooked, because they may have been undercooked.
 E. coli in strawberries from Newberg, Oregon, killed one person on August 8, 2011.  The Oregon Health Authority announced that they had linked at least 10 E. coli infections to a strawberry farm in Newberg, Oregon. Four patients had been hospitalized and an elderly woman died from kidney failure associated with her E. coli illness. The strawberries were sold to buyers who resold them at roadside stands and farmer's markets.
 One dead in California from Salmonella and 76 more people sickened in 26 states. On August 3, 2011, Cargill recalled  36,000,000 pounds of fresh and frozen ground turkey products produced at the company's Springdale, Arkansas, facility from February 20, 2011, through August 2, 2011, due to possible contamination from Salmonella Heidelberg.
 In March and April 2011, Jennie-O recalled almost 55,000 pounds of turkey burgers because drug-resistant Salmonella was found in its products.
 In June 2011, nearly 3,000 cases of Dole Food Company salad bags were recalled after a random test found the bacteria Listeria monocytogenes in a bag of the salad.
 The FDA said papayas imported from Mexico and distributed by Agromod Produce Inc. of McAllen, Texas, is likely the source of 97 cases of Salmonella Agona. To date, 10 people have been hospitalized but there have been no reported deaths. As a result, all papayas sold before July 23, 2011, were voluntarily recalled by Agromod. The cases were reported between January 1 and July 18 in 23 states. More than half of the cases were women, with ages ranging from 1 to 91 and an average age of 20; Texas had the most cases with 25 people falling ill.

2012 
 The 2012 salmonella outbreak caused sickness in hundreds of people in the Netherlands and the United States via Salmonella-tainted salmon.
 A peanut butter recall was voluntarily issued in September 2012 by Sunland Inc. due to salmonella. After further investigation, the recall included all 240 products, made at Sunland's production plant in Portales, New Mexico manufactured since March 1, 2010. A total of 35 people from 19 states were sickened from tainted products, most of them children. The Center for Disease Control (CDC), said the majority of those who became ill claim it was between June 11, 2012, and September 2, 2012. Officials from the Food and Drug Administration (FDA) found salmonella all over plant including improper handling of the products, unclean equipment and uncovered trailers of peanuts outside the facility. The total of people and states rose to 41 people in 20 states sold by Trader Joe's, Whole Foods, Safeway, Target and other large grocery chains. On November 26, 2012, the FDA suspended Sunland's registration to produce and distribute food product. Sunland had the right to a hearing and prove to the FDA that its facilities are clean and can reopen. Sunland closed  and filed for Chapter 7 bankruptcy on October 9, 2013.
 An unusual strain of E. coli bacteria caused the reported illness of 33 people across several states in the US, carried on organically grown greens like spinach and spring mix. This strain produces shiga toxin, which is thought to have been transferred to the species from the shigella bacterium, by a bacteriophage, a kind of virus that infects bacteria. Cases of food poisoning began to be reported in the New York State area on October 18, 2012. The CDC eventually concluded this was an example of O157:H7, its code for a strain of E. coli that is noteworthy for seeming to have genes from a different species, shigella, producing an unusual toxin, though not one especially lethal to human beings. Overall, 33 people in 5 states are known to have been infected. There were no deaths reported. This outbreak seems to have originated with food from State Garden, an organic produce company in Chelsea, Massachusetts.

2013 
 July – August.  The E. coli O157:H7 outbreak at Federico's Mexican Restaurant in Litchfield Park, Arizona, (a suburb of Phoenix) grew to include 79 people. At least 23 people were hospitalized in the outbreak, the largest E. coli outbreak in the United States for several years.  At least two people developed hemolytic uremic syndrome (HUS), a severe complication of an E. coli O157:H7 infection that can destroy the kidneys.  Victims filed civil suits against Federico's parent company, Femex LLC, in Maricopa County Superior Court.

2014 
 As of May 16, 2014, 12 cases of E. coli O157:H7 in 4 states (Massachusetts, Michigan, Missouri, and Ohio) from tainted ground beef from Wolverine Packing Company of Detroit, Michigan.

2015 
 In March 2015, organic food company Amy's Kitchen voluntarily recalled 74,000 cases of its products that could contain Listeria, due to contaminated organic spinach.
 In August through September 2015, over 300 people were infected with Salmonella. The bulk of the cases were in California and Arizona with the states of California and Texas having one fatality each.  It was traced to cucumbers from Mexico distributed by Andrew & Williamson Fresh Produce who, on September 4, 2015, voluntarily issued a recall.
 In October through November 2015, 45 people contracted E. coli from Chipotle Mexican Grill restaurants. The cases were in Washington State, California, Minnesota, New York, Ohio, and Oregon. At least 16 people were hospitalized. The outbreak warranted the closing and sanitization of over 40 Chipotle restaurants across Washington and Oregon. The restaurants reopened after discarding all supplies and ordering fresh ingredients.

2016 
 In April 2016, CRF Frozen Foods recalled over 400 organic and traditional frozen food products sold under 40 different brands due to contamination with Listeria monocytogenes. The outbreak was linked to 8 cases of listeriosis in the United States.

2017 
 In April 2017, a contained outbreak of the botulism toxin was confirmed in California, linked to a cheese sauce. There was no recall of the product.

2018 
 Hickory Harvest Foods announced a recall of organic nut mix, potentially infected by Listeria monocytogenes in May 2018.
 A strain of Escherichia coli bacteria caused the reported illness of 210 people across 36 states in the US, carried on Romaine lettuce from Yuma, Arizona. It prompted a multi-state investigation from the CDC and FDA. This outbreak began in the beginning of April 2018 and the FDA found that the contaminated Romaine lettuce came from a Yuma Farm. This strain produces shiga toxin, which is thought to have been transferred to the species from a strain of Shigella by a bacteriophage, a kind of virus that infects bacteria. On or after April 16, 2018, cases of food poisoning began to be reported in the New York State area. The CDC eventually concluded this was an example of O157:H7, its code for a strain of E. coli that is noteworthy for seeming to have genes from a different but related species, Shigella, producing an unusual toxin, though not one especially lethal to human beings. A 2022 study estimated that the total societal loss from the romaine lettuce recall was in the range of $276–$343 million.
 On November 20, 2018, the CDC, the U.S. Food and Drug Administration (FDA), and Health Canada announced that they were investigating a multistate binational outbreak of pathogenic Escherichia coli O157:H7 infections linked to romaine lettuce. This outbreak was separate from the previous outbreak traced to Yuma, Arizona.

2020s

2021 
 A salmonella outbreak was reported across 14 states in October 2021, with 102 people infected and 19 hospitalized. The source of the infections was reported to be from Denver, Colorado-based seafood supplier Northeast Seafood Products, who supplied seafood products to various grocery stores and restaurants, including Albertsons, Safeway, and Sprouts. Most people infected lived in or had traveled from Colorado.
 Three brands of onions were recalled in October 2021 after a salmonella outbreak in 37 states. 652 people were infected and 129 were hospitalized.

See also 
 List of foodborne illness outbreaks by death toll
 List of foodborne illness outbreaks (countries other than the United States)

References

Bibliography 

 
 
 

Disease outbreaks in the United States
United States health-related lists
Food safety in the United States
Lists of disasters in the United States
Food safety scandals